Flattery is the act of giving excessive compliments.

Flattery or Flatterer may also refer to:

 Flattery (film), a 1925 American silent film
 Flatterer (horse), a racehorse
 The Flattery Show, a radio show aired in France
 "Flattery", a track on the Aly & AJ album Insomniatic

See also
 Cape Flattery (disambiguation)